USNS Sgt. Archer T. Gammon (T-AK-243) was a  built at the end of World War II and served the war and its demilitarization as a commercial cargo vessel. From 1946 to 1950 she served the U.S. Army as a transport named USAT Sgt. Archer T. Gammon. In 1950 she was acquired by the United States Navy and assigned to the Military Sea Transportation Service. In 1973 she ended her career and was struck and scrapped.

Victory ship built in California
Sgt. Archer T. Gammon was laid down under U.S. Maritime Commission contract as Yale Victory (MCV hull 725) on 13 December 1944 by the Permanente Metals Corporation, Richmond, California; launched on 31 January 1945; sponsored by Mrs. Richard W. Owens; and delivered to the U.S. Maritime Commission's War Shipping Administration (WSA) on 24 February for operation by the Olympic Steamship Company.

U.S. Army service
On 18 June 1946, Yale Victory was transferred to the U.S. Army and commenced operations between San Francisco, California, and the Far East. Six months later, she changed her home port to Seattle, Washington; and, 31 October 1947, she was renamed Sgt. Archer T. Gammon. Two years later, the Military Sea Transportation Service (MSTS) was established; and, in March 1950, the cargo ship was transferred to the Navy for use in that organization and was placed in service as USNS Sgt. Archer T. Gammon (T-AK-243).

Service with the MSTS
During the early 1950s, she operated out of Seattle to Japan, Korea and Alaska. After the end of the Korean War, her range was extended. In the mid and late 1950s, she operated out of San Francisco to central and western Pacific Ocean ports and, during the periods of conflict in the Middle East, to Caribbean and western and eastern Atlantic Ocean areas.

In 1961, administrative control of the ship was transferred to MSTS, Atlantic, at New York City; and, since that time, Sgt. Archer T. Gammon continued to carry cargo for the Navy's transportation service, since renamed the Military Sealift Command, until the spring of 1973 when she was transferred to the U.S. Maritime Administration for disposal

Decommissioning
Her name was struck from the Navy List on 1 May 1973, and her hulk was sold to Chi Shun Hua Steel Co., Ltd., of Kaohsiung, Taiwan, on 19 November 1973.

Honors and awards
Qualified vessel personnel were eligible for the following:
National Defense Service Medal
Korean Service Medal
United Nations Service Medal
Republic of Korea War Service Medal

References

 
 NavSource Online: Service Ship Photo Archive - USNS Sgt Archer T. Gammon (T-AK-243) – ex - USAT Sgt Archer T. Gammon (1946 - 1950)

 

Victory ships
Ships built in Richmond, California
1945 ships
World War II merchant ships of the United States
Ships of the United States Army
Boulder Victory-class cargo ships
Korean War auxiliary ships of the United States